Attack of the 60 Foot Centerfold (also known as Attack of the 60 Foot Centerfolds) is a 1995 satirical science fiction film directed by Fred Olen Ray and starring J.J. North, Ted Monte, Tammy Parks, Raelyn Saalman, Nikki Fritz, John LaZar, Tim Abell, Jay Richardson as well as cameos by Russ Tamblyn, Michelle Bauer and a "running man" credit for science fiction author Brad Linaweaver. The film is a parody of Attack of the 50 Foot Woman (1958), but contains much nudity. The film was loosely remade as Attack of the 50 Foot Cheerleader (2012).

Plot

The three finalists for Plaything Magazine's "Centerfold of the Year" are Inga (Raelyn Saalman), Betty (Tammy Parks) and Angel Grace (J. J. North). During a photoshoot, Betty makes some rather scathing remarks regarding Angel's appearance. Angel goes to Dr. Lindstrom (John LaZar) at his clinic. Angel had taken beauty enhancing treatments previously, but now wants to get back on the program. Though Lindstrom warns her that any additional doses could be fatal, Angel still pleads to be put back on the program. Dr. Lindstrom gives her a case with several vials, cautioning her to only take one a day. That night, Angel takes her first vial. The result of it causes her breasts to increase in size.

Shortly thereafter, Angel, Betty and Inga go to the Plaything Mansion, and meet Bob Gordon (Jay Richardson), the founder of Plaything Magazine. The night before the photoshoot with all the girls, the shoot's photographer Mark (Tim Abell) tries to sleep with each of the girls. Though Betty and Inga shoot him down, Angel gives into his sweet talk.

Angel accidentally oversleeps and misses the beginning of the photoshoot. As she checks herself in the mirror, she realizes that she didn't take a vial the previous day, and wrinkles are settling in. In an act of desperation, she takes 3–5 vials. The overdose then causes her to pass out for just a moment. When she reawakens, she has grown easily 1–2 feet taller than normal. Angel is oblivious, even though her high heels and bikini seem smaller.

Making her way to the photoshoot, Angel and the girls begin posing for Mark. Everyone notices her sudden height increase despite not even being in heels. The other women get jealous Angel is getting all the attention. As the shoot continues, suddenly Angel faints. Mark, Betty and Inga go to alert Gordon while, Mark's assistant, Wilson (Ted Monte) stays behind. When the group returns, Wilson emerges from behind a nearby cliff, followed by Angel, now a giant.

Sometime afterward, a circus tent is set up for Angel, who is still upset at her sudden growth spurt. Back at the Plaything Mansion, Mark and Gordon plot to use Angel's size as a major selling point for the magazine, and then turn her over to the government for experimentation. Wilson overhears the conversation, and confronts Mark about the plan; Mark shrugs off Wilson's concerns.

Over the next couple days, Mark tries to win over Angel's embarrassment at being a giantess, in hopes that they can conduct her '60-foot photoshoot'. He explains that Gordon has arranged for a specialist to come in and help her, and that they have tried to call Dr. Lindstrom for her, but haven't been able to reach him.

Wilson one night sneaks into Angel's tent, and explains what he overheard. It is here that Wilson finally confesses his love for Angel, and his concern over Mark and Gordon's plan. After the conversation, Angel wanders out into the nearby desert to think.

The next day, Wilson manages to get a hold of Dr. Lindstrom, who agrees to come up to the Mansion to see Angel. As he finishes the conversation, Mark finds a rough-copy of the next issue of Plaything, with a 3–6 page spread, promising Plaything's 'Biggest Centerfold Yet.' Betty finds the issue and grows angry that Angel appears to have trumped her.

Some distance away from the Mansion, Mark has finally convinced Angel to do the photoshoot, taking pictures of her. Hellbent on revenge, Betty tries and fails to recruit Inga to her cause. Sneaking into Angel's room, Betty finds Angel's case from the Lindstrom clinic, and takes some of the vials causing her to grow to Angel's height.

Meanwhile, Angel has finished her shoot in the water tank and is snuggling with Mark, when  Gordon and Wilson meet up with her. Gordon continues his lie about a specialist coming, when Wilson finally exposes them as liars in front of Angel. Angel grows upset at being lied to, but the mood is shattered when Betty appears. Angel and Betty begin fighting, just as Dr. Lindstrom arrives. Lindstrom tries to administer a tranquilizer dart on Angel, but it instead ends up striking Betty, who pulls it out and throws it at Gordon. Angel and Betty then continue their fight which eventually leads them to downtown Los Angeles.

As Lindstrom, Mark and Wilson arrive, the girls have sent a myriad of people running down the darkened streets. Wilson uses Lindstrom's special antidote which shrinks Angel and Betty back to normal. Angel happily punches Betty, whom Mark runs to. Wilson goes to Angel's side, and the two embrace. Meanwhile, Mark forcibly tries to kiss Betty, who explodes, due to an instability with the antidote.

Cast

Production
Tommy Kirk has a small role in the film.

References

External links
 
 
 
 Attack of the 60 Foot Centerfold at Entertainment Weekly
 Movie Reviews
  Attack of the 60 Foot Centerfold at GeoCities
 Attack of the 60 Foot Centerfold at MySpaceTV
 Image Gallery

1995 films
1990s science fiction comedy films
1995 independent films
1990s parody films
American science fiction comedy films
American independent films
American parody films
1990s English-language films
Films about size change
Films directed by Fred Olen Ray
Films about giants
1995 comedy films
1990s American films